Walter Barton May ( – 31 May 1855) was a 19th-century English industrialist, famous for ordering the construction of Hadlow Castle.

References

Date of birth missing
1780s births
1855 deaths
British businesspeople
19th-century British businesspeople